Senator Barau I Jibrin CON (born 1959) is a Nigerian politician and member of the 9th National Assembly, from Kano State, Nigeria.

He represents Kano North Senatorial District. Senator Barau is the Chairman, Senate Committee on Appropriations and former Chairman of Senate Committee on Tertiary Institutions and TETFUND in the 8th Senate.

Early life and education 
Barau I Jibrin, was born in 1959, and he is a native of Kabo Township, Kabo Local Government Area, Kano State.

He holds a bachelor's degree in accounting, master's certificate in Financial Management and pricing, master's certificate in Management and Masters of business Administration (MBA). He also holds a certificate in Financial Management for business decisions from the prestigious Cornell University, United States.

After his initial higher studies, the Senator worked briefly in the accounting department of the Kano State Foundation, before he resigned in 1992 to begin his private flourishing business with vast interests in the manufacturing, insurance and the construction sectors of the Nigerian economy. His success in the private sector prepared him adequately to begin a process of championing the cause of his people through the instrumentality of politics.

Political life 
Barau's passion for his people motivated him to contest election in 1999 to the House of Representatives to represent Tarauni Federal Constituency of Kano State which he won. While in the House of Representatives, he served as the Chairman, House Committee on Appropriations. He was also a member of the House of Representative's Committee on Power during that period.

After his tour of duty in the House of Representatives, he promptly went back to his private business, but not without sustaining his interest in the political engineering of his native Kano State.

In later years, he served as the Chairman of the Kano State Investment and Properties Ltd; a Company wholly owned by the Kano State Government.

He was one time Commissioner of Science and Technology in Kano State. He was appointed in 2001 to serve as a member of a committee set up by former President Olusegun Obasanjo to review the Nigeria's Budgetary process. In 2009, he was appointed by the Kano State Government as a member of the Kano State Business Incentive Committee; a position in which he acquainted himself credibly.

On his return to electoral contest in 2015, Senator Barau contested and won election to the Senate of Federal Republic of Nigeria, representing Kano North Senatorial District under the platform of All Progressives Congress. He was appointed same year as the Vice - Chairman Committee on Petroleum Resources (Downstream) of the Senate, and subsequently became the  Chairman of the same Committee.

In the later part of 2016, he was reassigned to the Senate Committee on Tertiary Institutions and TETfund as the Chairman of the Committee.

Additionally to this Senate Portfolio, he is a member of the Committee on Niger Delta, Industries, Land Transportation and Appropriations.

He is also the Secretary of Northern Senators Forum.

On the 3rd of October, 2019; he sponsored a bill - Federal Polytechnic Kabo.

Personal life 
He is married and has children.

Awards 

 Northern Senator of the year 2017 by Nigerian Senate Press Corps
 In October 2022, a Nigerian national honour of Commander Of The Order Of The Niger (CON) was conferred on him by President Muhammadu Buhari.

References 

Nigerian businesspeople
1960 births
Living people
Cornell University alumni
Politicians from Kano State
All Progressives Congress politicians
Members of the Senate (Nigeria)